Hong Kong counts approximately 600 temples, shrines and monasteries. While Buddhism and Christianity are the most widely practiced religions, most religions are represented in the Special Administrative Region.

Buddhist temples and monasteries

 Cham Shan Monastery, Clear Water Bay Peninsula
 Chi Lin Nunnery, Diamond Hill, Kowloon
 Ling To Monastery, Ha Tsuen, Yuen Long District
 Miu Fat Buddhist Monastery, Lam Tei, Tuen Mun District
 Po Lin Monastery, Lantau Island
 Ten Thousand Buddhas Monastery, Sha Tin
 Tsing Shan Monastery (also called Piu To Temple), Tuen Mun
 Tsz Shan Monastery, Tung Tsz, Tai Po District
 Tung Lin Kok Yuen, Happy Valley
 Tung Po Tor Monastery, Lo Wai, Tsuen Wan District
 Wat Mekatamwanaram or Wat Tai Wo, Tai Po
 Wat Hong Kong Dhammaram, Yuen Long

Taoist temples and monasteries

 Ching Chung Koon (Tuen Mun)
 Chong Har Ching Ser (Fanling)
 Fung Ying Seen Koon (Fanling)
 Shang Sin Chun Tong (Kowloon Tong)
 Sin Hing Tung (Tuen Mun)
 Tai Sing Fat Tong (Sau Mau Ping)
 Wong Tai Temple (Luen Wo Hui)
 Wong Tai Sin Temple (Sik Sik Yuen) (New Kowloon)
 Wun Chuen Sin Koon (Ta Kwu Ling)
 Yuen Yuen Institute (Tsuen Wan District)

Joss houses

Tin Hau temples

Over 100 temples are dedicated, at least partially to Tin Hau. They include:
 Tin Hau Temple, located at 10, Tin Hau Temple Road, Causeway Bay, east of Victoria Park, in Eastern District, on Hong Kong Island. It is one of the declared monuments of Hong Kong. The temple has given its name to the MTR station serving it (Island line).
 Tin Hau Temple in Yau Ma Tei is also famous in Hong Kong. The public square, Yung Shue Tau before it is surrounded by a night market of Temple Street (a street named after it).
 Tin Hau Temple at Tai Miu Wan (大廟灣; Joss House Bay) is considered the most sacred. It is one of the Grade I historic building.
 Hau Kok Tin Hau Temple, stands by the Tuen Mun River channel and located next to Tin Hau Road in Tuen Mun.

Others

 Che Kung Temples, dedicated to Che Kung() (located in Sha Tin & Sai Kung)
 Chun Kwan Temple on Tsing Yi Island, dedicated to Chun Kwan
 Emperor Guan Temples (dedicated to Kwan Tai, also referred to as Lord Guan & Kuan Kong)
 Hip Tin Temples, list of thirteen temples in Hong Kong
 Kwan Tai Temples, list of fifteen temples in Hong Kong
 Man Mo Temples, dedicated to Kwan Tai and Man Cheong (located in Sheung Wan, Tai Po & Lantau Island)
 Kwan Kung Pavilion in Cheung Chau Island
 Fan Sin Temple in Sheung Wun Yiu, Tai Po
 Hau Wong Temples and Yeung Hau Temples, dedicated to Yeung Hau Tai Wong (list of thirteen temples in Hong Kong)
 Hung Shing Temples and Tai Wong Temples, dedicated to Hung Shing Tai Wong (list of forty-two temples in Hong Kong)
 Hung Shing Temple, Wan Chai, listed as a Grade I historic building and is part of the Wan Chai Heritage Trail
 I Shing Temple in Tung Tau Wai of Wang Chau, dedicated to Hung Shing and Che Kung
 Kwun Yam Temples (dedicated to Kwun Yam, also known as Guan Yin Bodhisattva)
 Kwun Yam Shrine in Repulse Bay
 Lin Fa Temple in Tai Hang
 Lam Tsuen wishing trees (located near the Tin Hau Temple in Fong Ma Po Village, Lam Tsuen)
 Lo Pan Temple in Kennedy Town, dedicated to Lo Pan
 Lung Mo Temples, dedicated to Lung Mo (list of four temples in Wan Chai, To Kwa Wan, Lo Wai and Peng Chau)
 Pak Tai Temples, dedicated to Pak Tai (list of fifteen temples in Hong Kong) 
 Yuk Hui Temple in Cheung Chau Island
 Pak Tai Temple in Wan Chai, which is a Declared Monument
 Sam Tai Tsz Temple and Pak Tai Temple in Sham Shui Po, dedicated to Sam Tai Tsz and Pak Tai
 Sam Shan Kwok Wong Temple, located in Ngau Chi Wan, next to Ping Shek Estate, along Kwun Tong Road
 Shing Wong Temples, dedicated to City God (list of four temples in Shau Kei Wan, Yau Ma Tei, Sau Mau Ping & Tuen Mun District)
 Tai Wong Temple in Yuen Long Kau Hui, dedicated to Hung Shing and Yeung Hau
 Tam Kung Temples and Tam Tai Sin Temples, dedicated to Tam Kung (list of four temples in Shau Kei Wan, Southern District, Happy Valley and Ping Chau)
 Tu Di Gong, or Earth God Temples & Shrines (like Fok Tak Temple in Tsim Sha Tsui)
 Yuk Wong Bo Din (玉皇寶殿) in Shau Kei Wan, dedicated to Yuk Wong (Jade Emperor)

Christian churches

Note: Only churches with wiki articles are listed on this list

Hong Kong Island

Central and Western District
 Cathedral of the Immaculate Conception (Roman Catholic)
 Hop Yat Church (Hong Kong)
 Peak Church (a former Protestant chapel)
 St John's Cathedral (Hong Kong)
 Union Church
 The Vine Christian Fellowship

Wan Chai District
 Chinese Methodist Church, at No. 36 Hennessy Road
 Sky City Church, meeting in the Apex of the Central Plaza
 Tung Fook Church (Protestant)

Kowloon and New Kowloon
 Holy Trinity Cathedral
 Kowloon Tong Alliance Church (Butterfly Valley), in Christian Alliance International School
 Kowloon Union Church
 Lifehouse International Church Hong Kong (Pentecostal)
 Rosary Church (Roman Catholic)
 St Andrew's Church, Kowloon
 Wing Kwong Pentecostal Holiness Church (Pentecostal)

New Territories
 Christ the Worker Parish (Roman Catholic)
 Crown of Thorns' Church (Anglican)
 Resurrection Church Sai Kung (Anglican)

Sha Tin
 Shatin Anglican Church (Anglican)
 Shatin Baptist Church
 Tao Fong Shan Christian Centre

Christian monasteries
 Trappist Haven Monastery, Lantau - Latin Rite Catholic
 Béthanie (Hong Kong) (former sanatorium and monastery)

Sikh temple

 Khalsa Diwan Sikh Temple - at the corner of Queen's Road East and Stubbs Road

Synagogues
 Ohel Leah Synagogue - Robinson Road

Mosques

 Jamia Masjid - Shelley Street, Hong Kong Island
 Kowloon Masjid and Islamic Centre - Nathan Road, Tsim Sha Tsui
 Ammar
 Stanley Mosque
 Chai Wan Mosque
 Ibrahim Mosque

Church of Jesus Christ of Latter-Day Saints

 Hong Kong China Temple located on Cornwall Street, Kowloon Tong

See also

 Hong Kong Government Lunar New Year kau chim tradition
 Taai Ping Ching Jiu (太平清醮)
 Cheung Chau Bun Festival
 Zhizha & Papier-mache offering shops in Hong Kong
 Religion in Hong Kong
 List of buildings and structures in Hong Kong
 Chinese folk religion
 Chinese ritual mastery traditions

References

 
Hong Kong religion-related lists